The 2018–19 Utah Runnin' Utes men's basketball team represented the University of Utah during the 2018–19 NCAA Division I men's basketball season. The team, led by eighth-year head coach Larry Krystkowiak, played their home games at the Jon M. Huntsman Center in Salt Lake City, Utah as members of the Pac-12 Conference. They finished the season 17–14, 11–7 in Pac-12 play to finish in third place. They lost in the quarterfinals of the Pac-12 tournament to Oregon.

Previous season
The Utes finished the 2017–18 season 23–12, 11–7 in Pac-12 play to finish in a three-way tie for third place. They lost in the quarterfinals of the Pac-12 tournament to Oregon. They were invited to the National Invitation Tournament where they defeated UC Davis, LSU, Saint Mary's, and Western Kentucky to advance to the championship game. In the NIT championship, they were routed by Penn State, losing 82–66.

Off-season

Departures

Incoming transfers

2018 recruiting class

2019 recruiting class

Roster

Schedule and results

|-
!colspan=12 style=| Exhibition

|-
!colspan=12 style=| Non-conference regular season

|-
!colspan=12 style=| Pac-12 regular season

|-
!colspan=12 style=| Pac-12 tournament

References

2018–19 Pac-12 Conference men's basketball season
2017-18 team
Utah Utes
Utah Utes